Degree of Difference Testing, which is also known as DOD is a method to determine an overall difference among test and control groups when product in question has exhibited variability that would have caused because of multiple factors such as the production time, use of multiple components, preparation or others. It is one of the Discrimination methods. It was introduced by Aust, L. B., Gacula Jr., M. C., Beard, S. A., and Washam II, R.W. in the year 1985. As a method, DOD is used when other traditional methods that have a single control group fails and multiple control groups have to be introduced. Degree of Difference had hence replaced the traditional triangle test for products since those methods would give false results that were statistically significant in situations where the control variability was high. The disadvantage of Degree of Difference method is that while it can give you a measure of difference, it is not able to give the source of those differences and hence one won't know where to make corrections to reduce the variation.

References 

Food technology
Product testing